The arytenoid muscle  is a single muscle of the larynx. It passes from one arytenoid cartilage to the opposite arytenoid cartilage. It has oblique and transverse fibres. It is supplied by the recurrent laryngeal nerve. It approximates the arytenoid cartilages. Continuous electromyography may be used during neck surgeries such as thyroidectomy.

Structure 
The arytenoid muscle fills the posterior concave surface of the arytenoid cartilage. It arises from the posterior surface and lateral border of one arytenoid cartilage. It is inserted into the corresponding parts of the opposite arytenoid cartilage.

It consists of oblique and transverse fibres.

Nerve supply 
The arytenoid muscle is supplied by the recurrent laryngeal nerve, a branch of the vagus nerve (CN X). This is a bilateral supply.

Function 
The arytenoid muscle approximates the arytenoid cartilages. This closes the aperture of the glottis, especially at its back part to eliminate the posterior commissure of the vocal cords.

Clinical significance

Electromyography 
Function of the arytenoid muscle is a good method to determine function of the recurrent laryngeal nerve. Continuous electromyography of the arytenoid muscle can provide confidence to surgeons that the recurrent laryngeal nerve is not damaged during neck surgeries, such as thyroidectomy.

Other animals 
The arytenoid muscle is found in many animals, including dogs.

Additional images

References 

Muscles of the head and neck